{{DISPLAYTITLE:C19H38O2}}
The molecular formula C19H38O2 may refer to:

 Nonadecylic acid, or nonadecanoic acid
 Isopropyl palmitate
 Pristanic acid
 Tuberculostearic acid

Molecular formulas